Andrija Bojić (born May 28, 1993) is a Serbian professional basketball player, who play as a power forward for Mladost MaxBet of the Basketball League of Serbia and ABA League.

References

External links 
 Profile at aba-liga.com
 Profile at beobasket.net
 Profile at eurobasket.com
 Profile at fiba.com

1993 births
Living people
ABA League players
Basketball League of Serbia players
KK Borac Čačak players
KK Mega Basket players
KK Mladost Zemun players
OKK Beograd players
Power forwards (basketball)
Serbian expatriate basketball people in Hungary
Serbian expatriate basketball people in Poland
Serbian expatriate basketball people in Romania
Serbian expatriate basketball people in North Macedonia
Serbian men's basketball players
Basketball players from Belgrade
KK MZT Skopje players